Mesfouf, or masfouf is an Algerian and Tunisian dish which is a variant of couscous with finely rolled semolina and butter or olive oil.

This food is quite popular in the Maghreb. It is conventional to consume the mesfouf during the holy month of Ramadan. It is served at traditional celebrations or family meals.

Local recipes
In Algeria, it is served as a main dish made of peas and beans. According to them, it is advisable to drink it with some whey or yoghurt to facilitate digestion even though it is lighter than couscous.

There are many local recipes for the mesfouf, such as the savory one and the sweet one. Some people opt for the one which contains vegetables and meat. As for the others, they want it accompanied with peas and dried grapes as in the surrounding of Tunis. 
Sfaxians prefer it decorated with almond and dates and dried fruits (pistachios, hazel nuts) and custard.
Some people also like to pour milk on the mesfouf and add sugar to it to make it sweet, as a "cereal", and some dried grapes and/or dates.

As for the Djerbian version of the mesfouf, it is spicy and it is often composed of peppers and dried meat and various herbs (garlic, fennel, lavender...)

See also
 List of Middle Eastern dishes
 List of African dishes

References

Arab cuisine
Algerian cuisine
Tunisian cuisine
Middle Eastern cuisine